Stanimir Andonov (born 30 September 1989) is a Bulgarian football player who currently plays as a midfielder for Zaria Krushari.

References

Living people
1989 births
Bulgarian footballers
Association football midfielders
PFC Vidima-Rakovski Sevlievo players
PFC Dobrudzha Dobrich players
Neftochimic Burgas players
First Professional Football League (Bulgaria) players